Bernard Guignedoux (31 January 1947 – 1 January 2021) was a French professional football player and manager. He is known for being the first goal-scorer in the history of Paris Saint-Germain.

Playing career 
Guignedoux was a graduate of the RC Paris academy. He played one season with the club in the Division 2 before joining Stade Saint-Germain in 1966, where he continued studies while playing third tier football. In 1970, Stade Saint-Germain merged with Paris FC to create Paris Saint-Germain; therefore, Guignedoux joined the newly formed club.

Guignedoux made his debut for PSG in the first game of the club's history on 23 August 1970, a 1–1 league draw against Poitiers. He scored the first goal in PSG history as he found the top-left corner from a shot on a free-kick.

In an interview with PSG70 in 2005, Guignedoux recalled his favorite memory from his time as a PSG player being the promotion to the Division 1 in 1971. "There was extraordinary enthusiasm. I remember the construction of the team with the merging of experienced professionals and young players. It was a fabulous year," he said. Guignedoux's final match for PSG was a 1–0 loss against Angers on 27 May 1972.

In 1972, Paris Saint-Germain split into two, with the re-formed Paris FC staying in the first division, and PSG getting the reserve players while being relegated to the third tier. As Guignedoux had a professional contract at the club, he joined Paris FC and left Paris Saint-Germain. Two years later, in 1974, he joined Monaco, who were also competing in the Division 1.

After three seasons in Monaco, Guignedoux returned to his former club Paris FC. He spent three years at the club before retiring in 1980, at the age of 33.

Post-playing career 
Guignedoux's involvement with football did not end after retiring from the sport itself. Firstly, in 1980, he became a physiotherapist for his former club Paris FC. He then spent a short amount of time as a P.E. teacher before becoming the coach of the Paris Saint-Germain C team in 1981.

After eleven years at the position of PSG's C team coach, Guignedoux became the coach of PSG's under-15 squad. He stayed there for seven years before returning to his former role of C team coach in 1999. In July 2001, Guignedoux once again left the role of PSG C team coach, this time to be part of PSG's youth system. He returned to the PSG C team in February 2002, only to go back to his position in the youth academy five months later.

In October 2003, Guignedoux became the assistant manager of Strasbourg, under the direction of Antoine Kombouaré. Twelve months later, he stepped down from the position to become a scout for the club's youth academy. In June 2005, Guignedoux joined Valenciennes as the assistant manager of the club, once again in a collaboration with Kombouaré. Valenciennes won the Ligue 2 and achieved promotion in Guignedoux's first season as assistant coach. From 2009 to June 2012, Guignedoux was the technical director in the amateur departments of Paris Saint-Germain. 

On 16 December 2012, Guignedoux honored Ezequiel Lavezzi with a trophy for being the scorer of the 3,000th goal in PSG history; Guignedoux was the first ever scorer for the club, back in 1970.

Health issues and death 
On 12 April 2020, at the age of 73, Guignedoux was hospitalized. This was due to an unnamed "serious disease" he contracted, which left his health condition deteriorating. 

Guignedoux died on 1 January 2021, at the age of 73.

Career statistics

Honours

Player 
Paris Saint-Germain
 Division 2: 1970–71

Individual
 Division 2 Player of the Year: 1970

References 

1947 births
2021 deaths
French footballers
French football managers
Sportspeople from Saint-Germain-en-Laye
Association football forwards
Racing Club de France Football players
Levallois SC players
Stade Saint-Germain players
Paris Saint-Germain F.C. players
Paris FC players
AS Monaco FC players
Valenciennes FC managers
RC Strasbourg Alsace managers
Ligue 2 players
Ligue 1 players
Ligue 1 managers
Ligue 2 managers
French expatriate footballers
Expatriate footballers in Monaco
French expatriate sportspeople in Monaco
French physiotherapists
Paris Saint-Germain F.C. non-playing staff
Championnat de France Amateur (1935–1971) players
Footballers from Yvelines